The Delhi–Fazilka line is a railway line connecting Delhi and Fazilka the latter in the Indian state of Punjab. The line is under the administrative jurisdiction of Northern Railway. This line was a part of the historic Delhi–Karachi line.

History
The line passed through Rohtak-Jind-Bhatinda-Muktasar-Fazilka-Bahawalnagar and provided direct connection through Samma Satta (now in Pakistan) to Karachi. The extension from the Macleodganj (later renamed Mandi Sadiqganj and now in Pakistan) railway line to Ambala via Qasamwala-Hindumalkote-Abohar-Bhatinda-Patiala was opened by the same company in 1902.
In 1901–02, the Jodhpur–Bathinda line of Rajputana–Malwa Railway was extended from Bikaner to Bathinda via Hanumangarh, to connect it with the metre-gauge section of the Bombay, Baroda and Central India Railway to the south and the metre-gauge of North Western Railway's Delhi–Fazilka line (Delhi–Hisar–Bhatinda–Karachi line) to the north. In 2000s, Jodhpur-Bikaner-Bathinda line was converted to broad gauge. In 2009, the metre gauge Hisar-Sadulpur section was converted to broad gauge.

Border crossings
Fazilka and Hussainiwala on this line are two defunct railway border crossing points on the India–Pakistan border. After partition of India, a  line linked Amruka on the Pakistan side of the India–Pakistan border, opposite Fazilka, towards Samma Satta. The only train running through these tracks was withdrawn after 1965 war. The Hussainiwala–Ganda Singh Wala railway crossing, near Firozpur, became defunct with the partition of India. The  broad gauge line from Kasur Junction in Pakistan has been closed. The strategically important  Kaiser-E-Hind Rail cum Road Bridge was blown up during the Indo-Pakistani War of 1971 at Hussainiwala, and was never rebuilt. In 2013, Sutlej Barrage Bridge on Hussainiwala was opened after restructuring.

Electrification
The Okhla–New Delhi–Shakurbasti line was electrified in 1982–83. , only 3 km of the 60 km Shakurbasti–Rohtak was remaining. The EMU services of Delhi Suburban Railway was extended up to Rohtak in 2013.

After electrification up to Rohtak, further electrification begun in February 2015. Operations of electric locos up to Jind begin in January 2018. After this, electrification up to  got completed in March 2018.

Electrification of Kurukshetra–Narwana and Jind–Panipat branch lines was started in 2018 and has been completed in 2019.

Electrification of Jind–Sonipat branch line is also under planning.

Electrification of Bathinda-Firozpur branch line is in progress.

Tracks
Delhi–Bathinda is a double electric line.

The construction of Bathinda-Firozpur single line electrification is in under progress.

Sheds
Shakurbasti has a diesel loco shed. It houses WDS-4A, WDS-4B, WDS-4D, WDM-2 WDM3A, WDS6 and DEMUs. It also has a broad-gauge trip shed for WDM-2 and WDG-3A locos. WDS-4 shunting locos based all over Northern Railway are sent here for periodical maintenance.

Developments
The  new  broad gaugeline between Fazilka and Abohar was opened in 2012.

The Rewari–Rohtak line was commissioned in 2013.

Work for a new line from Rohtak to Hansi via Meham was inaugurated in 2013.

A new line from Jind to Sonipat was completed in 2015 and is operational now.

Central Government approved a new rail line from Jind to Hansi via Narnaund.

Railway reorganisation
Southern Punjab Railway was taken over by the state and merged with North Western Railway in 1930.

With the partition of India in 1947, North Western Railway was split. While the western portion became Pakistan West Railway, and later Pakistan Railways, the eastern part became Eastern Punjab Railway.

In 1952, Northern Railway was formed with a portion of East Indian Railway Company, west of Mughalsarai, Bikaner Railway and Eastern Punjab Railway.

Stations

Julana railway station is in the Julana tehsil of Jind District  from Delhi on the Delhi–Fazilka line.

References

External links
Trains at Old Delhi
Trains at Sarai Rohilla
Trains at Bhathinda
Trains at Firozpur Cantonment
Trains at Fazilka

5 ft 6 in gauge railways in India
Rail transport in Haryana
Rail transport in Punjab, India

Railway lines opened in 1897